The 2000–01 Oklahoma Sooners men's basketball team represented the University of Oklahoma in competitive college basketball during the 2000–01 NCAA Division I men's basketball season. The Oklahoma Sooners men's basketball team played its home games in the Lloyd Noble Center and was a member of the National Collegiate Athletic Association's Big 12 Conference.

The team posted a 26–7 overall record (12–4 Big 12). The Sooners received a bid to the 2001 NCAA tournament as No. 4 seed in the South region. The team was upset by No. 13 seed  in the opening round, 70–68 in overtime.

Roster

Schedule and results

|-
!colspan=9 style=| Non-conference regular season

|-
!colspan=9 style=| Big 12 Regular Season

|-
!colspan=9 style=| Big 12 Tournament

|-
!colspan=9 style=| NCAA Tournament

Rankings

References

Oklahoma Sooners men's basketball seasons
Oklahoma
Oklahoma